Crossover Island Light is a lighthouse on the Saint Lawrence River in New York state near the Canada–United States border.

The lighthouse was established in 1848 and the last tower was first lit in 1882.  The lighthouse was deactivated in 1941.  The foundation is stone molehead and the lighthouse is made out of cast iron with brick and wood lining.  The tower is a white conical tower with a red lantern.  The original lens was a sixth-order Fresnel lens.

The lighthouse was added to the National Register of Historic Places as Crossover Island Light Station in 2007.

Notes

References
Hill, Ralph E. "Lighthouse Memories: Life on Crossover Island." The Keeper's Log (Summer 1991), pp. 18–22

Further reading
 Oleszewski, Wes. Great Lakes Lighthouses, American and Canadian: A Comprehensive Directory/Guide to Great Lakes Lighthouses, (Gwinn, Michigan: Avery Color Studios, Inc., 1998) .
 Wright, Larry and Wright, Patricia. Great Lakes Lighthouses Encyclopedia Hardback (Erin: Boston Mills Press, 2006) 

Lighthouses completed in 1848
Houses completed in 1848
Lighthouses on the National Register of Historic Places in New York (state)
National Register of Historic Places in St. Lawrence County, New York
Transportation buildings and structures in St. Lawrence County, New York